This is a list of notable Serb architects or architects of other ethnic background associated with Serbia.

A 
 Marko Andreijić (c. 1470 - after 1507)
 Andreja Andrejević (19th century)
 Nikola Antić (19th century)
 Milan Antonović (1850-1929)
 Ilija Arnautović (1924-2009)
 Louis D. Astorino
 Ivan Antić (1923-2005)

B 
 Aleksandar Bugarski (1835-1891)
 Petar Bajalović (1876-1947)
 Đura Bajalović (1879-1949)
 Bogdan Bogdanović (1922-2010)
 Jovanka Bončić-Katerinić (1887-1966)
 Dragiša Brašovan (1887-1965)
 Ksenija Bulatović (born 1967)
 Aleksej Brkić (1922-1999)
 Uglješa Bogunović (1922-1994)
 Ljiljana Bakić (1939) 
 Dragoljub Bakić (1939)
 Zoran Bojović (1936-2018)
 Branko Bojović (1940)

C 
 August Cerman (19th century)
 Predrag Cagić (1941-2016)
 Mihailo Canak (1932-2014)

D 
 Pavle Djakonović (19th century)
 Vojislav D. Dević (1952)
 Aleksandar Đokić (1936-2002)
 Nikola Dobrović (1897-1967)
 Nikola Djordjević (19th century)
 Andreja Damjanović (1813-1878)
 Dragutin Djordjević (1866-1933)

E

F 
 Jovan Franck (19th century)
 Johann Franzel (19th century)

G

H 
 Hadži-Neimar (1792-1870; see Nikola Živković)
 Filip Hristović (19th century)

I 
 Svetozar Ivačković (1844-1924)
 Olja Ivanjicki (1931-2009)
 Vladislav Ivković (1926 -2018)
 Bogdan Ignjatović (1912-2004)

J 
 Franz Janke (1790-1860)
 Adolf Jakša (19th century)
 Mihailo Janković (1911-1976)
 Konstantin Jovanović (1849-1923)
 Emilijan Josimović (1823-1897)
 Aljoša Josić (1921-2011)
 Miroslav Jovanović (1924-2003)
 Branislav Jovin (1935–2018)
 Borivoje Jovanović (1938)
 Božidar Janković (1931-2017)
 Milorad H. Jevtić (1932)

K 
 Josif Kasano (19th century)
 Erazmus Kaminski (19th century)
 Milan Kapetanović (1854-1932)
 Marko Kovač (born 1981)
 Branislav Kojić (1899-1986)
 Momir Korunović (1883-1969)
 Krstić Brothers (1899-1991) (1902-1978)
 Milica Krstić (1887-1964)
 Stanko Kliska (1896-1969)
 Petar Krstić (1899-1991) 
 Branislav Krstić (1902-1978)
 Aleksandar Keković (1939-2018)
 Spasoje Krunić (1939)
 Dušan Krstić (1938-2014)

L 
 August Lange (19th century)
 Dimitrije T. Leko (1863-1914)
 Svetislav Ličina (1931)
 Milan Lojanica (1939)

M
 Andrija Marković (1400-1438)
 Paskoje Miličević Mihov (c. 1440-1516)
 Dragutin Milutinović (1868-1941)
 Dragutin Maslać (19th century)
 Franc Mil (19th century)
 Milorad Macura (1914- 1989)
 Stanko Mandić (1915-1987)
 Uroš Martinović (1918-2004)
 Branko Maksimović (architect) (1900-1988)
 Milenija Marušić (1941)  
 Darko Marušić (1940-2017)
 Slobodan Mihajlović (1922-2005)
 Branislav Mitrović (1948)
 Vasilije Milunović (1948)
 Dimitrije Mladenović (1936)
 Branislav Milenković (1926)
 Dejan Miljković (1967)

N 
 Jan Nevole (1812-1903)
 Nikola Jovanović (19th century)
 Joca Novaković (19th century)
 Jovan Novak (19th century)
 Jelisaveta Načić (1878-1955)
 Nikola Nestorović (1868-1957)
 Atanasije Nikolić (1803-1882)
 Vladimir Nikolić (1857-1922)
 Juraj Neidhardt (1901-1979)
 Dejan Nastić (1926-2008)

O 
 Rista Odavić (1870-1932)

P 
Branko Popović (1882-1944)
Petar Popović (1873-1945)
Jovan Prokopljević (born 1940)
 Milorad Pantović (1910-1986)
 Miloš Perović (1939)
 Milan Pališaški (1927-2017)
 Zoran Petrović (1925-2000)
 Božidar Petrović (1922-2012)

R 
 Konstantin Radotić (19th century)
 Milorad Ruvidić (1863-1914)
 Jovan K. Ristić (19th century)
 Ivanka Raspopović (1930-2015)
 Predrag Ristić (1931-2019)
 Ranko Radović (1935-2005)
 Vujadin Radovanović (born 1962)

S 
 Kosta Šreplović (1836-1872)
 Pavle Stanišić (19th century)
 Josif Silvić (19th century)
 Andra Stevanović (1859-1929)
 Bojan Stupica (1923-2016)
 Leonid Šejka (1932-1970)
 Milica Šterić (1914-1997)
 Aleksandar Stjepanović (1931)

T 
 Branko Tanazević (1876-1945)
 Momčilo Tapavica (1872-1949)
 Vladislav Titelbah (1847-1925)
 Stojan Titelbah (1877-1916)
 Dobrivoje Tošković (1927)

V 
 Andrija Vuković (19th century)
 Mihailo Valtrović (1839-1915)
 Mihailo Valtrović (1839-1915)
 Danilo Vladisavljević (1871-1923)
 Petar Vulović (1931-2017)
 Goran Vojvodić (1959)

W
 Ernest Weissmann (1903–1985)

Z 
 Hadži-Neimar (Nikola Živković) (1792-1870)
 Dušan Živanović (19th century)
 Milan Zloković (1898-1965)

See more 
 Serbian architecture

See also

 Architecture of Serbia
 List of architects
 List of Serbs
 List of people from Serbia

References

Serbian
Architects